Volleberg is a village in Kristiansand municipality in Agder county, Norway. The village is located along the river Songdalselva, in former Songdalen municipality, right on the border with former Søgne municipality (pre 2020). The village is primarily a residential community with people working in the nearby urban areas of Kristiansand and Søgne.

References

Villages in Agder
Geography of Kristiansand